This is a list of the monastic houses in County Carlow, Ireland.

Notes

References

See also
List of monastic houses in Ireland
List of National Monuments in County Carlow
List of country houses in County Carlow

Monastic houses
Monastic houses
Carlow
Monastic houses